Teacher of the Year is a 2014 independent comedy film directed by Jason Strouse and starring Matt Letscher and Keegan-Michael Key.

Premise
Surrounded by the eccentric faculty of Truman High School, Mitch Carter wins the California Teacher of the Year award and immediately receives a tempting offer that may force him to leave his job.

Cast
Matt Letscher as Mitch Carter
Keegan-Michael Key as Ronald Douche
Sunny Mabrey as Kate Carter
Larry Joe Campbell as Marv Collins
Jamie Kaler as Steven Queeg
Jason Sklar as Lowell Hammer
Maile Flanagan as Hannah Manning
Randy Sklar as Clive Hammer
Tamlyn Tomita as Vivian Lew
Brenda Strong as Ellen Behr
Caitlin Carmichael as Sierra Carter
Chris Conner as Brian Campbell
Eden Riegel as Jackie Campbell
Shari Belafonte as Robin Rivers
Olivia Crocicchia as Faith Gregory
Jonathan Goldstein as John Collier

Production
The film is shot in a mock documentary format. In fact, one of the teachers makes a reference to This Is Spinal Tap, one of the most influential films in the mockumentary format.

Director and screenwriter Jason Strouse was a high school English teacher when he made the film.

Reception
Critics lauded the film's deft combination of humor and drama. It has a 100% score on Rotten Tomatoes, based on seven reviews.

References

External links

2014 films
2010s mockumentary films
2014 independent films
American high school films
American independent films
Films about educators
Films set in Los Angeles
American mockumentary films
2014 directorial debut films
2014 comedy films
2010s English-language films
2010s American films